GCTC may refer to:

 Gagarin Cosmonaut Training Center, a space travel facility in Russia
 Great Canadian Theatre Company, a dramatic theatre company in Ottawa, Ontario, Canada
 Global City Teams Challenge, a collaborative platform for the development of smart cities and communities, led by National Institute of Standards and Technology, a bureau of United States Department of Commerce, in partnership with other U.S. federal agencies including National Science Foundation, International Trade Administration, and the National Telecommunications and Information Administration.
 Gulf Coast Trades Center in Walker County, Texas